Vinderslevholm is a Late Gothic manor house located 10 km (6 mi) northwest of Silkeborg, Denmark. It is situated on a narrow peninsula which reaches into Hinge Lake and is separated from the mainland by a moat.

History
The estate is first mentioned in 1442. It was known as Vinderslevgård between 1578 and 1910. The main building was most likely built for Niels Skeel (died 1561). It was adapted both in the 19th century and in the 1910s. Most of the land was sold off in 1907.

Today
Vinderslevholm was owned by Ladekjær Mikkelsen until 2008 and is now owned by Dansk Erhversprojekt A/S.

In popular culture

Vinderslevholm has been featured in Den Store Bagedyst, DR1's version of The Great British Bake Off.

References

External links
 Official website

Listed buildings and structures in Silkeborg Municipality
Listed castles and manor houses in Denmark
Gothic architecture in Denmark